Seqanliq (also Romanized as Seqānlīq, Soqānlīq, and Saqānlīq; also known as Sāqānlūq) is a village in Nur Ali Beyk Rural District, in the Central District of Saveh County, Markazi Province, Iran. At the 2006 census, its population was 826, in 207 families.

References 

Populated places in Saveh County